James Doolan is a former Irish Fianna Fáil politician. He was a member of Seanad Éireann from 1980 to 1981. He was elected to the Administrative Panel of the 14th Seanad at a by-election in April 1980, following the election of Liam Burke to the Dáil. He was not re-elected at the 1981 Seanad election. He was an unsuccessful Fianna Fáil candidate for the Connacht–Ulster constituency at the 1979 European Parliament election. He was an unsuccessful candidate at the 1993 and 1997 Seanad elections. He is a former professor at University College Galway.

References

Year of birth missing (living people)
Living people
Fianna Fáil senators
Members of the 14th Seanad